Woolfe is the surname of:

 Eric Woolfe, actor and artistic director in Toronto
 Harry Bruce Woolfe (18801965), English film producer in the 1920s30s
 John Woolfe (1932–1969), British racing driver
 Kevin Woolfe (1930–2002), Australian rugby player in the 1950s
 Nathan Woolfe (born 1988), English footballer
 Richard Woolfe (born 1962), TV producer and senior executive in British broadcasting
 Steven Woolfe (born 1967), British politician
 Sue Woolfe (born 1950), Australian writer
 Zachary Woolfe, American classical music critic
Fictional people
 Syd Woolfe, in Emmerdale, a British soap opera

See also
 Woolf (surname)

Surnames from given names